Nor Chichas is a province in the Eastern parts of the Bolivian Potosí Department. Its seat is Cotagaita.

Location
Nor Chichas province is one of sixteen provinces in the Potosí Department. It is located between 20° 01' and 21° 08' South and between 65° 13' and 66° 17' West. It borders José María Linares Province in the north, Antonio Quijarro Province in the west, Sud Chichas Province in the south, and Chuquisaca Department in the east. The province extends over 120 km from east to west and 140 km from north to south.

Geography 
Some of the highest mountains of the province are listed below:

Division
The province comprises two municipalities which are further subdivided into cantons.

Population
The main language of the province is Quechua, spoken by 99.5%, while 69% of the population speak Spanish. The population dropped from 38,250 inhabitants (1992 census) to 35,323 (2001 census), a decrease of 17%.  

92% of the population have no access to electricity, 87% have no sanitary facilities. 73% of the population are employed in agriculture, 4.5% in mining, 4% in industry, 18.5% in general services. 79% of the population are Catholics, 17% Protestants. 55% of the population are female.

The people are predominantly indigenous citizens of Quechua descent.

References 

Population data (Spanish)

 

Provinces of Potosí Department